Who Killed Hannah Jane? is a 1984 Australian television film about the murder conviction of Arthur Peden directed by Peter Fisk and starring Graham Rouse, June Salter, Judi Farr, Edward Howell, and Barry Otto. It was the third of four telemovies called Verdict produced by the ABC dramatising real cases (the others being The Dean Case, The Amorous Dentist, and The Schippan Mystery).

Background
Based on the 17 May 1921 murder of Gundagai resident, Hannah Jane Peden, and the subsequent June 1921 trial in Sydney, and conviction of her husband, Arthur Bryce Peden. After an appeal, and based on the benefit of the doubt, Peden was released from Long Bay Gaol on 28 February 1922.

Cast
 Graham Rouse - Arthur Peden
 June Salter - Mrs Edwards
 Judi Farr - Hannah Jane Peden
 Edward Howell - Mr Andrews
 Barry Otto - James Harnney
 Jennifer Hagan - Marion Andrews
 Peter Whitford - James Gannon
 Francis Bell - Archibald McDonnell
 John Gregg - William Coyle
Leonard Teale - Mr Justice Street

Media

 book - Tom Molomby, Who killed Hannah Jane (1981)
 article - D.J. Pounder, The Peden case: an Australian forensic disaster. The Medical Journal of Australia, v.153, no.11-12, (3–17 December 1990), p. 712-715.

References

External links
Who Killed Hannah Jane? at Austlit
Who Killed Hannah Jane? at Screen Australia

Australian television films
Films directed by Peter Fisk
1980s English-language films